Aziana Ebele Mbombo, nicknamed Doudou (born 11 September 1980) is French a former professional footballer who played as a winger.

Career
Doudou spent six years with Monaco, before signing for English club Queens Park Rangers in 2001, where his wages were paid for by fan Harold Winton. Over the next two seasons, Doudou made 46 appearances in the Football League. Doudou moved to non-league side Farnborough Town in January 2004, before returning to English league football with Oxford United in January 2005. After making 1 League appearance for Oxford, he returned to France to play with Racing Paris.

References

1980 births
Living people
French footballers
AS Monaco FC players
Queens Park Rangers F.C. players
Farnborough F.C. players
Oxford United F.C. players
English Football League players
French expatriate footballers
French expatriate sportspeople in England
Expatriate footballers in England
Association football wingers